Chuck Norris facts are satirical factoids about American martial artist and actor Chuck Norris that have become an Internet phenomenon widespread in popular culture. These 'facts' are absurd hyperbolic claims about Norris's toughness, attitude, sophistication, and masculinity.

Chuck Norris facts have spread internationally, making translations and spawning localized versions about country-specific advertisements and other Internet phenomena. Some facts allude to his use of roundhouse kicks for seemingly any task, his large amount of body hair with specific regard to his beard, and his role in the action television series Walker, Texas Ranger.

Background
Chuck Norris facts originally appeared on the Internet in early 2005. Initially distributed in the Something Awful forums, the "facts" centered on Vin Diesel, in response to his film The Pacifier. After a few months, forum members chose Chuck Norris to be the new subject. Conan O'Brien's Chuck Norris jokes on Late Night with Conan O'Brien (which generally center on Walker, Texas Ranger) have been seen as an inspiration for the fad. The exaggerated style of these claims is similar to a recurring Saturday Night Live sketch called "Bill Brasky". Due to the popularity of this phenomenon, similar jokes have been created for various other celebrities, as well as fictional characters.

Norris' response
Norris responded to the Chuck Norris facts on his official website with a statement. Admitting some of the statements were indeed humorous, he said he tries not to take any of them seriously, and he hopes that such statements will interest people in real facts about him contained in his literary works.

On October 23, 2006, Norris' first column for WorldNetDaily consisted of another response. It began similarly to the above statement from chucknorris.com, but then disclaimed his own prowess in favor of those of God and Jesus Christ.

On November 29, 2007, Gotham Books, the adult division of Penguin USA, released a book entitled The Truth About Chuck Norris: 400 facts about the World's Greatest Human. Norris subsequently filed suit in December against Penguin USA claiming "trademark infringement, unjust enrichment and privacy rights". Norris dropped the lawsuit in 2008.

On October 7, 2009, Tyndale House Publishers issued The Official Chuck Norris Fact Book, which was co-written and officially endorsed by Norris.

Norris has stated that his personal favorite "fact" is that people wanted to add Norris to Mount Rushmore, but the granite was not tough enough for his beard.

Prominent mentions
In the March 20, 2006 issue, Time magazine interviewed Norris, calling him an "online cult hero". In the answer to their last question, he called the Chuck Norris Facts "weird but wildly popular sayings" and quoted one: "Chuck Norris can divide by zero."

In 2011, a commercial for World of Warcraft featured Chuck Norris and included its own "Chuck Norris facts" in the dialogue.

In the 2012 movie The Expendables 2, there is a wink at Chuck Norris facts when one is attributed to Norris' character Booker. In one scene Booker saves Barney Ross's (Sylvester Stallone) team in a firefight. After introductions all around, Ross says to Booker, "I heard another rumor. That you were bitten by a king cobra." "Yeah, I was.", Booker replies, adding, "But after five days of agonizing pain, <pause> the cobra died."

Inspirations and similar trends
In India, there exist similar jokes in the form of factoids and quotes about Indian film actor Rajinikanth. The factoids about Rajinikanth are inspired by Chuck Norris facts in that those follow the same pattern as Chuck Norris facts. While some Rajinikanth jokes are original, many of them are circulated with Norris' name replaced by Rajinikanth's. The beginning of 2013 saw similar cluster of jokes gaining trend in the country on Indian cricketer Ravindra Jadeja after Indian cricket captain Mahendra Singh Dhoni tweeted a few "facts" about him on his Twitter page.

During the 2012 Armenian parliamentary election, some ballots with Norris's name written on them as a candidate were found.

In Egypt, and prior to the Egyptian presidential election, 2012, similar jokes were made upon Omar Suleiman, the ex-director of the General Intelligence Directorate in the same style of Chuck Norris facts, making fun of the powers and skills that his supporters claimed to be his to promote him before the elections.

In the episode "The Weird World of Wyrm" of the 2012 CGI series version of Teenage Mutant Ninja Turtles, a holographic Chris Bradford – a parody of Norris – delivers a Norris Facts-esque quotation: "Chris Bradford fact #48: Chris Bradford always carries around four weapons of mass destruction: His arms and his legs."

Buffalo Bills fans began promoting similar tall tales about former linebacker Kiko Alonso during the 2013 season, after Alonso joined the team as a rookie. The tall tales were collectively known as "The Legend of Kiko Alonso".

Makmende, a Kenyan male fictional hero, has been purported to perform locally related feats and more, including in Sheng.

In 2006, a naming poll was held to decide the name of a new bridge in Hungary. Since nominations were accepted from everyone, "Chuck Norris" soon became the top candidate for the bridge's name (beating the names of several historical figures along with candidates like David Hasselhoff and Eric Cartman), before being taken over by Stephen Colbert after he called his fans to vote. The bridge was eventually named Megyeri Bridge. 

WWE wrestler Brian Myers, known as Curt Hawkins, incorporated the Chuck Norris facts into his gimmick in August 2016, where he uses his name instead of Norris, e.g., "Children have to put sunscreen on at the beach to protect themselves from Curt Hawkins".

Video games based on trend 

In 2008, Gameloft produced Chuck Norris: Bring On the Pain, a video game for mobile devices, based on the online Norris cult elicited by Chuck Norris facts. The player takes control of Norris in a side-scrolling beat 'em up. The game was well-reviewed.

In 2017, Flaregames produced the second such game, Non Stop Chuck Norris, an isometric action-RPG game for mobile devices, also well reviewed.

Bibliography
Ian Spector: The Truth About Chuck Norris: New York: Gotham Books: 2007: 
Chuck Norris & Todd DuBord: The Official Chuck Norris Fact Book: 101 of Chuck's Favorite Facts and Stories: Tyndale House Publishers: 2009:

See also
 Bill Brasky
 The Stig
 The Most Interesting Man in the World
 Makmende

References

External links
 
 

American folklore
Internet memes
Joke cycles
Cultural depictions of Chuck Norris
Internet memes introduced in 2005
2000s in Internet culture
2005 neologisms